The enzyme indole-3-glycerol-phosphate lyase catalyzes the chemical reaction

(1S,2R)-1-C-(indol-3-yl)glycerol 3-phosphate  indole + D-glyceraldehyde 3-phosphate

This enzyme belongs to the family of lyases, specifically the aldehyde-lyases, which cleave carbon-carbon bonds.  The systematic name of this enzyme class is (1S,2R)-1-C-(indol-3-yl)glycerol-3-phosphate D-glyceraldehyde-3-phosphate-lyase (indole-forming). Other names in common use include tryptophan synthase alpha, TSA, indoleglycerolphosphate aldolase, indole glycerol phosphate hydrolase, indole synthase, indole-3-glycerolphosphate D-glyceraldehyde-3-phosphate-lyase, indole-3-glycerol phosphate lyase, IGL, BX1, (1S,2R)-1-C-(indol-3-yl)glycerol 3-phosphate, and D-glyceraldehyde-3-phosphate-lyase.  This enzyme participates in benzoxazinone biosynthesis.

References

 
 
 
 

EC 4.1.2
Enzymes of unknown structure